Chhotalal is a surname. Notable people with the surname include:

Ranchhodlal Chhotalal (1823–1898), Indian industrialist
Jayantilal Chhotalal Shah (1906–1991), Indian jurist

References